Alida/Cowan Farm Private Aerodrome  is located  east-northeast of Alida, Saskatchewan, Canada.

Highways nearby include Highway 601 and Highway 361.

See also
List of airports in Saskatchewan

References

Registered aerodromes in Saskatchewan